The 2008 Russian Figure Skating Championships took place between 3 and 7 January 2008 at the Ice Palace in Saint Petersburg. Skaters competed at the senior level in the disciplines of men's singles, ladies' singles, pair skating, and ice dancing.

The event was used as one of the criteria to help determine the team for the 2008 European Championships.

Senior results

Men

Ladies

Pairs

Ice dancing
 Reigning national champions Oksana Domnina / Maxim Shabalin did not compete due to injury.

Junior results

The 2008 Russian Junior Championships were held in Rostov-on-Don from 30 January through 2 February 2008. The event was among the criteria used to choose the team for the 2008 World Junior Championships.

Men

Ladies

Pairs
 Bazarova / Larionov, the reigning Junior Grand Prix Final champions, did not compete at Jr Nationals due to a doping violation which resulted in his suspension.

Ice dancing

References

External links
 2008 Russian Figure Skating Championships

Russian Figure Skating Championships
Russian Figure Skating Championships
Figure skating
Figure skating
January 2008 sports events in Europe
Russian Figure Skating Championships